Greg Norman (born 1955) is an Australian entrepreneur and retired professional golfer.

Greg Norman may also refer to:

Golf related
 Greg Norman Holden International, a golf tournament held annually from 1993 to 2001
 Greg Norman Medal, an Australian golf award established in 2015
 Greg Norman's Golf Power, a golf-simulation video game published in 1992

People
 Gregory Norman Bossert (born 1962), American writer and filmmaker
 Gregory Norman Ham (1953–2012), Australian musician, songwriter, and actor
 Gregory Norman Mahle (born 1993), American professional baseball pitcher

Other
 16046 Gregnorman, a minor planet discovered in 1999

See also
 Greg Gorman (born 1949), American portrait photographer of Hollywood celebrities
 Norman Gregg (1892–1966), Australian ophthalmologist and discoverer of congenital rubella syndrome
 Greg Orman (born 1968), American politician, businessman, and entrepreneur